DL Tauri is a young T Tauri-type pre-main sequence stars in the constellation of Taurus about  away, belonging to the Taurus Molecular Cloud. It is partially obscured by the foreground gas cloud rich in carbon monoxide, and is still accreting mass, producing 0.14  due to release of accretion energy. The stellar spectrum shows the lines of ionized oxygen, nitrogen, sulfur and iron.

Protoplanetary system
Star is surrounded by a massive (0.029 )protoplanetary disk, which is extensive yet relatively flattened and rich in large grains, indicated a significantly evolved state. The area of disk about 100 AU from the star may be on the verge of the gravitational instability. The disk have a multiple dust rings with poorly resolved gaps between.

Suspected planetary companion 
The object 2MASS J04333960+2520420, designated DL Tau/cc1 in 2008, is a suspected superjovian planet with mass about 12 on the likely bound orbit around DL Tauri. The object may be still a brown dwarf or even low-mass star if strongly veiled by accretion disk, which is not unusual for the young star systems.

References 

T Tauri stars
Circumstellar disks
Taurus (constellation)
J04333906+2520382
 Hypothetical planetary systems
Tauri, DL